Highway 691 is a highway in the Canadian province of Saskatchewan. It runs from Highway 55 near Snowden to Highway 106.

See also 
Roads in Saskatchewan
Transportation in Saskatchewan

References 

691